Whitewater kayaking is an adventure sport where a river is navigated in a decked kayak. Whitewater kayaking includes several styles. River running; where the paddler follows a river and paddles rapids as they travel. Creeking usually involving smaller, steeper, and more technical waterways. Creek boats tend to be short but high volume to allow for manoeuvrability while maintaining buoyancy. Slalom requires paddlers to navigate through "gates" (coloured poles hanging above the river). Slalom is the only whitewater event to be in the Olympics. Play boating involves staying on one feature of the river and is more artistic than the others. Squirt boating uses low-volume boats (usually made specifically for the paddler) to perform special moves in whitewater features.

History

Paddling on rivers, lakes and oceans is as old as the Stone Age. The raft, the catamaran, the canoe and the kayak evolved depending on the needs and environment of the indigenous peoples in different parts of the world. The modern day kayak most likely originated about 8,000 years ago along the Siberian coast line by the Yupik and then transformed from the open canoe, via the Aleut and Inuit, into an enclosed kayak. The first boats made were hard to sink because they contained inflated seal bladders, which made them ideal for navigating whitewater.

The Greek, Herodotus, 484-425 BC, wrote in his travel diaries about boats with which merchandise was brought from Armenia to Babylon. The boats were made of a wooden framework that was covered with animal skins. Mules hauled the precious skins back to Armenia.

The Russian, Grigori Ivanovitch Langsdorff, reported from his trip around the world (1803–07) on the ease and elegance of paddling Eskimo (Inuit) kayaks/canoes. In 1866 he published the book A Thousand Miles in the Rob Roy Canoe. The timing was right and the book became a resounding success. With the Industrial Revolution leading to more leisure time in the middle of the 19th century, people in Europe started to enjoy floating down rivers in various contraptions taking in nature previously only available to a selected few.

1905, Alfred Heurich, an architectural student from Leipzig, Germany, invented the "Faltboot", a folding kayak called Folboat in the US.

1907, Alfred Klepper, a master seamster from Rosenheim, bought the patent, improved the rigidity with a lever system and started production. Born was the Western culture's invention of a paddle craft that for the first time in human history that allowed hardy enthusiasts to see wild river sections and canyons never before seen by the human eye. The design not only made it suitable for whitewater (WW); it was also easy to travel with and was affordable. World War I stopped any progress.

1920s, boating on WW with Folboats developed. Boaters flocked to rivers and lakes by train or bus. During that time, the Austrian, Edi Hans Pawlata reinvented the Eskimo roll.

1927, Franz von Alber, and then Klaus and Arndt von Rautenfeld, claimed to have independently developed a roll with their sea kayaks.

In the early 1930s, Walter Frentz, Herbert Rittlinger and a handful of others became pioneers and advocates of WW kayaking with documentaries and books.

1933, Adolf Hitler started to dissolve kayak clubs. They did not serve his plan and the impact on the sport was devastating. World War II brought the paddle sport to a total halt.

1946–48, In some regions, the Allies gradually lifted the ban on river travel in Germany. Paddle clubs were again allowed to form.

1952, Walter Frentz, published an inspiring book In den Schluchten Europas (In the Canyons of Europe) that gained popularity. The book was based on his river trips prior to World War II. Publications in those days told great stories with awesome pictures of first descents but with little information regarding river conditions. The tough times of the post war era had come to an end and people traveled abroad again looking for adventures with Folboats and canoes.

1955, Herbert Baschin in Stuttgart built the first polyester/fiber kayak. Despite the much improved manoeuvrability and material, Baschin's hard shell was received with skepticism by paddle sport enthusiasts who were in love with their folboats and depended on public transportation. The ice broke when owning an automobile became affordable. The hard shell kayak was easily hauled to rivers and remote put-ins that were not accessible before. In the late 60s the WW sport started to spread from Europe around the world and transformed from adventure trips into a hardcore sport. With it came safety consciousness and protective gear.

1973, Tom Johnson, a racer and trainer from Kernville, California designs and markets the Hollowform: the first roto-moulded polyethylene boat. It was mass-produced by a garbage can manufacturing company. These virtually indestructible boats revolutionized the sport and quickly took off in California. Paddlers no longer had to constantly repair their boats during and after trips. They began to be able to use rocks as part of the strategy of negotiating difficult rapids. Hard runs became more accessible to less-skilled paddlers.

In 1978, Bill Masters, a kayaker and inventor in Liberty, South Carolina further perfected rotational moulding for kayaks with his company Perception Kayaks. Bill advanced the sport of whitewater kayaking beyond any of his predecessors through consistent innovations in manufacturing and design. His patented processes are still used to this day.

In 1980 the manufacturer Prijon in Rosenheim introduced polyethylene to Europe which made WW boating virtually maintenance and repair free in giant contrast to the Faltboot which had started it all.

1980 Holger Machatschek, together with ESKIMO kayak company in Landsberg, Germany, developed the first  playboat called Topolino which galvanized kayaking into many new and exciting forms of extreme sports.

Types
There are five "sub-categories" in whitewater kayaking, each typically utilizes a unique kayak design:

River running
Riverrunning (practitioners use one word) is the essential - and some would say most artful - form of kayaking. Whereas its derivative forms (described below under the headings of Creeking, Slalom, Playboating and Squirt boating) have evolved in response to the challenges posed by riverrunning, such as pushing the levels of difficulty and/or competing, riverrunning, of its own right, is more about combining one's paddling abilities and navigational skills with the movements and environments of rivers themselves. Important to a riverrunner is the experience and expression of the river in its continuity rather than, say, a penchant for its punctuated "vertical" features (e.g. standing waves, play-holes and waterfalls). As for kayak design, a "pure" riverrunning boat can be said to have "driving ability" - a blend of qualities that enables the paddler to make the most of the differential forces in the river's currents. For example, instead of spinning or pivoting the boat to change its direction, a riverrunner will drive the boat in such a way as to make use of the river's surface features (e.g. waves, holes and eddylines) thus conserving the boat's speed and momentum (this is in particular contrast to slalom racing, where, in the attempt to negotiate certain kinds of slalom gates, the boater will pivot the boat to change its direction, and by so doing, diminish the boat's speed and momentum.) A principal design characteristic of riverrunning kayaks (as well as for their closest cousin the slalom boat) is their comparatively longer length and narrower breadth (generally minimum 285cm in length and maximum 63cm in breadth). The longer length at the waterline not only helps to carry speed but the longer arcs thus created between stem and stern allow the boater to more efficiently and gracefully carve into, through and out of eddies and other currents.

Creeking

Creeking is perhaps best thought of as a subcategory of river running, involving very technical and difficult rapids, typically in the Grade/Class IV to VI range. While people will differ on the definition, creeking generally involves higher gradient (approaching or in excess of 100ft per mi (19 m per km)), and is likely to include running ledges, slides, and waterfalls on relatively small and tight rivers, though some will allow for very large and big volume rivers in their definition. Kayaks used for creeking usually have higher volume (more gallons or litres of displacement) and more rounded bow and stern, as these features provide an extra margin of safety against the likelihood of pinning (getting a kayak wedged in such a way that it cannot be removed without a mechanical advantage system, such as between rocks and/or underwater), and will resurface more quickly and controllably when coming off larger drops. Creek boats usually have increased "rocker," or rise, fore and aft of the cockpit for manoeuvrability. Extreme racing is a competitive form of this aspect of whitewater kayaking, in which kayakers race down steep sections and or generally dangerous sections of whitewater.

Slalom

Slalom is a technical competitive form of kayaking, and the only whitewater event to appear in the Olympic Games. Racers attempt to make their way from the top to the bottom of a designated section of river as fast as possible, while correctly negotiating gates (a series of double-poles suspended vertically over the river). There are usually 18–25 gates in a race which must be navigated in sequential order. Green gates must be negotiated in a downstream direction, red gates in an upstream direction. The events are typically conducted on Grade/Class II to Grade/Class IV water, but the placement of the gates, and precision necessary to paddle them fast and "clean" (without touching a pole and adding 2 seconds to the total time), makes the moves much harder than the water's difficulty suggests. Pro level slalom competitions have specific length ( for kayaks – new rules), width, and weight requirements for the boats, which will be made out of kevlar/fibreglass/carbon fiber composites to be lightweight and have faster hull speed. Plastic whitewater kayaks can be used in citizen-level races.

Playboating

Playboating, also known as Freestyle or Rodeo, is a more gymnastic and artistic kind of kayaking. While the other varieties of kayaking generally involve going from Point A to Point B, playboaters often stay in one spot in the river (usually in a hole, pourover or on a wave) where they work with and against the dynamic forces of the river to perform a variety of manoeuvres. These can include surfing, spinning, and various vertical moves (cartwheels, loops, blunts, pistol and donkey flips, and many others), spinning the boat on all possible axes of rotation. More recently, aerial moves have become accessible, where paddlers perform tricks having gained air from using the speed and bounce of the wave. Kayaks used for playboating generally have relatively low volume in the bow and stern, allowing the paddler to submerge the ends of the kayak with relative ease. Competitions for playboating or freestyle are sometimes called whitewater rodeo in the US, but more frequently just referred to as freestyle events in UK and Europe.

Squirt boating

Squirt boating incorporates the use of low-volume boats to perform special moves in whitewater features. Squirt boating predates, and was critical to the foundation of, playboating. Squirt boats are often fairly long and flat, with low volume throughout the design. Because squirt boats are custom built to the paddlers weight, inseam, and personal preference, they are constructed with composite materials instead of plastic. Many squirt moves are intended to submerge all or part of the craft and paddler, such as the "mystery move," in which both the boat and the paddler submerge completely into the river's flow for several seconds and up to half a minute.

Techniques

Paddle strokes
A variety of different paddle strokes are used to guide, propel and turn the boat in various ways. Some strokes are used in combinations to perform manoeuvres such as the "S-turn".

Ready position
Kayaking, especially in whitewater is all about always having your paddle in the water, however holding the paddle properly is best learned in the air. To properly hold a paddle you should try to make a box with your arms and paddle, shaped with 90 degree angles at your elbows and wrists. The blades on the paddle need to be equidistant from each hand, and the power face of the blade, or scoop, should be facing your stern. This position ensures your hands are in the correct location on the shaft.

Forward stroke
The forward stroke is the most intuitive paddle stroke in kayaking although proper technique is important to master. To do a forward stroke the paddler holds his paddle vertically, with one hand close to the face, and the other hand outstretched outside of the knee. The paddle enters the water near the toes of the paddler, and the paddle is pushed out with the upper hand and pulled in with the lower hand, keeping the paddle vertical. To incorporate more than just the arms and upper back, paddlers should twist their torsos to reach and twist back while pulling to maximize their reach and power. The blade should leave the water by the paddlers' hips, and the low hand comes up to the face, with the face hand reaching out to outside the knee on its side in order to initiate the next stroke.

Back stroke
The back stroke is almost the forward stroke exactly backwards, although often it is shorter and the paddler may need to time "peeks" at his destination during the stroke to ensure tracking.

Low brace
This is an important stroke to learn as paddlers move from flat-water to whitewater, as it is a flip prevention stroke. The low brace is a manipulation of the ready position in kayaking. With the box commented on above, the paddler rotates their elbows up so the power face faces the sky. To brace the paddler takes "the box" and moves it out to the side they are falling over on. Keeping their elbows high they can slap the outstretched blade down on the water and push down and slide it back towards their boat as they redistribute their weight over of their boat, stopping themselves from flipping over.

High brace
If the paddler is already well on their way to flipping over they may use the high brace to right themselves. By dropping their elbows and reaching the necessary blade to the surface on the side they are flipping on the paddler can use the power face to pull down on while doing a side crunch to redistribute their weight over their boat. The High Brace is exactly the same technique as the C to C roll when the paddler is closer to being upside down.

Forward sweep
In order to turn the paddler needs to master the forward sweep. In paddling momentum is the paddlers best tool for successful advancement, and so ruddering or back sweeps as a way of turning, results in decreased momentum and a higher chance of getting flipped or caught in a hole or wave. To forward sweep right the paddler will need to bring their left blade to their toes like they would in a forward stroke although this time they will drop their right hand from their face, to their biceps, making the paddle more horizontal. They will then move their blade in a semi circle around their boat finishing at their stern.

Back sweep
The back sweep is the forward sweep in reverse, move the blade from the stern to the bow in a semi circle. Matching forward sweeps and back sweeps together is the fastest way to turn a boat if needed.

Duffek/Bow rudder
When paddling downstream paddlers can use some advanced paddle strokes along with differing currents to quickly turn their boat, one of these strokes is the duffek. In a river current generally moves downstream, but behind rocks or on shore the water may be still or actually move upstream. When a paddler moves from one of these currents to the other they can use the duffek stroke to quickly turn their boat into the direction of the current. A good visual representation of the duffek in real life is thinking about someone running down a sidewalk, grasping a pole on the sidewalk and swinging around it with legs outstretched to end up running in the other direction, momentum intact. In a kayak this can be achieved by putting a vertical paddle blade in the opposing current when crossing from one current to another. The hardest part of the duffek is keeping your paddle vertical right by your knee, and keeping the power face always facing exactly perpendicular with the current you are grabbing. In other words, the scoop of the blade always needs to be facing where the current is coming from. This is tricky because as you turn your blade will turn with you unless you twist your wrists to keep it static. If done correctly paddlers can enter and exit opposing currents with one duffek that can be turned into a powerful forward stroke upon completion.

Rolling and roll aftermath

Rolling is an essential skill in whitewater kayaking. This technique allows a flipped boater to regain an upright position. There are a variety of different styles of rolling, but in whitewater paddling the styles which offer protection of the face receive special emphasis.
The roll is normally used instead of a T rescue (so named because two kayaks form a T shape when used). If the roll does not end with the kayaker upright they can set up again and make additional attempts. Multiple failed rolls usually result in the paddler running out of breath and "swimming" (a swim means exiting the boat completely and entering the water).

Handpaddling
Handpaddling refers to paddling without a conventional paddle. Instead, the kayaker uses plastic hand paddles. This technique is appropriate for paddlers that prefer to roll without a paddle (hand roll). Audrey Adamchak, age 14, thought to be the youngest woman to kayak the classic 225 miles whitewater stretch of the Colorado River in the Grand Canyon, accomplished this feat with hand paddles crafted by her father.

Boofing
Boofing, in whitewater kayaking, refers to the raising of the kayak's bow during freefall, while descending a ledge, ducking behind a boulder, or running a waterfall. This technique is used to avoid submerging the bow of the kayak by ensuring it lands flat when it hits the base of the waterfall. The term is an onomatopoeia which mimics the sound that is usually created when the hull of the kayak makes contact with water at the base of the waterfall.

Another type of boof is the "rock boof" which is a move that uses a glancing impact with a boulder at the top of a ledge to bounce the boater over a downstream feature, often finished with a mid-air eddy turn. Rock boofs result in sounds both at the top of the drop (boat impacting rock) and the bottom (boat bellyflopping into the water).

Equipment

Kayaks 
Whitewater kayaks differ from many other types of recreational kayaks in that they are intended specifically to be used in rapids. As a result, they have several features that make them safer and more durable in this environment. It is not recommended to use touring kayaks in whitewater rivers.

Composition 
Rotomolded plastic that can withstand repeated impacts and abrasion is most common. Most have the ability to be "welded" after significant damage. Earliest models were typically fiberglass and it was common to join a club to learn how to build your own. Today most composite kayaks are reserved for slalom or squirt boating.

Other features 

 A large cockpit for easy exit in an emergency.
 A cockpit rim for attaching a spray skirt.
 Grab loops for extraction from a rock pin.
 Center pillars made of foam and provide support and prevent collapse from pressure.
 Thigh braces and hip pads maintain body contact with the kayak for more efficient paddling and easier rolling.
 Back band. More recreational kayaks have a back band that rises up above the cockpit for extra comfort. Whitewater kayak back bands are lower in order to accommodate a spray skirt.
 Rocker, a feature of the hull of the boat where both the bow and stern are curved upward, allowing the kayak to go up and over rocks more effectively, as well as allow for more maneuverability by reducing the length of the water line.

Paddles

There are three main categories of differences between kayak paddles: composition, twist/feather, and shaft shape/length.

Composition
Earlier paddles were often made of wood and then later with a heavy metal shaft and poly-synthetic blades. Advances in technology today include carbon fiber shafts with foam and carbon fiber blades on the high end, and low flex but light plastic on the low end, sometimes with rubber grips.

Shaft

Paddles with blades included historically measured over 200 cm, but now usually measure between 185 and 205 cm. Also the industry has begun to offer bent shafts that are ergonomically shaped to relieve stress off of the paddlers wrists. Many companies also offer specialized rubber grips to ease the paddlers grip and provide a place to feel where hands should hold the shaft. Small and regular shaft thicknesses may be available as well to offer smaller paddlers more comfort while gripping the paddle.

Other
In addition to the boat and paddle there are several other pieces of gear that are necessary for whitewater paddling. A buoyancy aid (BA) or personal flotation device (PFD), helmet, and spray deck (sometimes known as a sprayskirt) are considered essential while a throwbag, knife, and safety whistle are recommended as standard pieces of safety gear. Many people also wear a nose clip since flipping the boat is a normal part of the whitewater experience. In addition the boater must be dressed appropriately for the water temperature, which might simply be a wetsuit or drysuit. The boat itself should be equipped with enough flotation to make pinning less likely and help enable its recovery.

See also 
 Canoeing at the Summer Olympics
 Freeboating
 List of whitewater rivers
 Rafting
 River surfing
 Riverboarding
 Whitewater canoeing
 Whitewater recreation in British Columbia
 U.S. intercollegiate canoe/kayak champions

Notes

External links 

 
 River level Readings (in the Americas)
 Waterfall Kayaking Produced by Oregon Public Broadcasting
 Perkins, L. (2016). Whitewater kayaking. [online] Motionvideo.co.nz. Available at: http://www.motionvideo.co.nz/?catid=0&id=302 [Accessed 28 Sep. 2016].

Whitewater sports
Kayaking